{{DISPLAYTITLE:C6H5ClO}}
The molecular formula C6H5ClO (molar mass: 128.56 g/mol, exact mass: 128.0029 u) may refer to:

 Chlorophenols
 2-Chlorophenol, or ortho-chlorophenol
 3-Chlorophenol
 4-Chlorophenol